Denny Gropper (or Danny Gruper, ; born 16 March 1999) is an Israeli professional footballer who plays as a left-Back or as a midfielder for Bulgarian club Ludogorets Razgrad and for the Israel national football team.

Early life
Gruper was born in Haifa, Israel, to a family of Ashkenazi Jewish descent. His uncle is Israeli former international footballer Ronny Rosenthal.

Club career
Gropper joined the Maccabi Haifa  youth department as a child. In 2015 he moved to the youth departments of Hapoel Haifa and Ironi Nesher. In 2018 he first appeared in a senior team when he signed for one season at Hapoel Afula, where he impressed with a breakout season when he scored 4 goals in 30 league games in the National League.
In May 2019 he signed for three seasons at the Israeli Hapoel Tel Aviv club. In March 2022 Gropper signed a contract with Bulgarian champions Ludogorets Razgrad.

Honours
Ludogorets Razgrad
 First Professional Football League (Bulgaria): 2021–22
 Bulgarian Supercup: 2022

See also 
 List of Jewish footballers
 List of Jews in sports
 List of Israelis

References

External links
 

1999 births
Israeli Ashkenazi Jews
Living people
Israeli Jews
Israeli footballers
Jewish footballers
Association football midfielders
Israel youth international footballers
Israel under-21 international footballers
Israel international footballers
Hapoel Afula F.C. players
Hapoel Tel Aviv F.C. players
PFC Ludogorets Razgrad players
Liga Leumit players
Israeli Premier League players
First Professional Football League (Bulgaria) players
Footballers from Haifa
Israeli expatriate footballers
Expatriate footballers in Bulgaria
Israeli expatriate sportspeople in Bulgaria